Heteronemertea is a monophyletic order of about 500 species of nemertean worm. It contains genera such as Lineus and Cerebratulus, and includes the largest and most muscular nemerteans.

Almost all heteronemerteans have three primary body-wall muscle strata: an outer longitudinal, a middle circular, and an inner longitudinal. The lateral nerve cords are outside the circular muscle, as in palaeonemerteans, but separated from the epidermis by the usually well-developed outer longitudinal muscle.

Taxonomy
Families within the order Heteronemertea include:
Baseodiscidae
Cerebratulidae
Gorgonorhynchidae
Lineidae
Mixolineidae
Panorhynchidae
Poliopsiidae
Polybrachiorhynchidae
Pussylineidae
Riseriellidae
Valenciniidae

References

 
Anopla